Frank Kreith (15 December 1922 – 8 January 2018) was an American mechanical engineer.

Born in Vienna, Kreith fled Austria after the annexation of Austria into Nazi Germany in 1938 as a member of the Kindertransport. He obtained degrees from the University of California, Berkeley (1945), the University of California, Los Angeles (1949) and the University of Paris (1965). Kreith worked at the Jet Propulsion Laboratory, received a fellowship from the Daniel and Florence Guggenheim Foundation to study at Princeton University and taught at Berkeley and Lehigh University before becoming a faculty member at University of Colorado Boulder in 1959. He was head of the Solar Thermal Conversion research branch at the Solar Energy Research Institute (SERI) and subsequently served as the ASME Legislative Fellow at the National Conference of State Legislators, advising lawmakers on energy and environmental issues. Kreith published more than 100 articles in peer-reviewed journals, authored or edited 15 books (among them the seminal textbook Principles of Heat Transfer), and was the Journal of Solar Energy Engineering's editor-in-chief from 1980 to 1987.

Honors and awards
 1981 Worcester Reed Warner Medal, American Society of Mechanical Engineers (ASME)
 1985 Max Jakob Memorial Award, ASME and American Institute of Chemical Engineers (AIChE)
 1988 Charles Greeley Abbot Award, American Solar Energy Society (ASES)
 1992 Ralph Coats Roe Medal, ASME
 1997 Washington Award, Western Society of Engineers
 1998 ASME Medal
 2001 Edwin F. Church Medal, ASME
 since 2006 Namesake of the Frank Kreith Energy Award, ASME
 2017 John Fritz Medal, American Association of Engineering Societies

References

1922 births
2018 deaths
American mechanical engineers
American people of Austrian-Jewish descent
ASME Medal recipients
Austrian emigrants to the United States
John Fritz Medal recipients
University of Colorado Boulder faculty
Austrian Jews
Kindertransport refugees
Engineers from Vienna